Location. Kalri is a village in District Bhimber, of Azad Kashmir. It is located equidistant between Bhimber and Mirpur approximately 25 km on either side. At an altitude of 357 meters above sea level, it is situated at a latitude of 33.06 (33° 3' 30 N) and a longitude of 73.9 (73° 53' 50 E).

The People. The village is inhabited predominantly by  CHIB Rajputs. Other castes living within the jurisdiction of Union Council Kalri include Syed, Arain, Kashmiri, Sheikh, Malik, Mughal, etc. Until the late 1970s, the main profession of the people of the town involved working in Army. Since then, the trend has shifted and increasing numbers have emigrated, particularly to the United Kingdom.

Institutions and Amenities. The village is served by Government Higher Secondary School for Boys  and Government High School for Girls, Post Office, United Bank Limited, telephone facility and a Basic Health Unit and Jamia Mosque.

Establishment of Army Public School (APS) at Kalri. Considering the long-standing desire of the people of the area for better education of their children, particularly those  retired and serving Army soldiers, Pakistan Army eventually approved establishment of an APS at Kalri, a central place with all weather accessibility to vast majority of people in the area. Its first academic session commenced in May 2014 from Play-Group to Fifth class. In view of overwhelming response of the locals, foundation stone for purpose-built School Campus was laid down in January 2015 being financed through various sources including donation of land/ funds by the locals. This is likely to serve as mile-stone for upcoming generation of the area.

Establishment of Niabat (Sub Tehsil). Considering the difficulties of the people from far flung areas who had to often travel for even minor land and revenue related issues to Tehsil Headquarters, Azad Kashmir Government has established "Niabat" at Kalri with the concept to provide basic services to the people at their door-step. This shall pave way for further development of the area.

Notables/ Important Personalities. Major Raja Muhammad Afzal khan (Shaheed), Fakhar-e-Kashmir, was a legendary figure of this village who fought for Ali Beg, Dhudial, Gala Ballah Mirpur, Chechian and Gowindpur (now Afzalpur) during Kashmir Liberation War of 1948. While leading an operation against the Indian stronghold of Khamba Fort on Matlashi Ridge, he was seriously wounded and as a result embraced Shahadat.  In recognition of his courage, bravery and supreme sacrifice to a sacred cause, he was awarded gallantry award of Fakhar-e-Kashmir. He was nephew of Lieutenant Colonel Raja Dilawar Khan (late), who was also his mentor; Brigadier Raja Ghaus Muhammad (late) was the eldest son of Lieutenant Colonel Raja Dilawar Khan.

Lieutenant General Raja Muhammad Akbar Khan (late) was another stalwart, a legendary figure and highly respected personality this village has produced. He had been commander 5 Corps, former DG ISI, GOC 12 Division  and former Ambassador to the United Kingdom and Mexico. He also represented Pakistan at SEATO and CENTO. In his memory, the village has been renamed as Kalri akbar abad

Najamun Nisa Begum (late) daughter of Lieutenant Faqir Muhammad Khan (late) & mother of Headmaster Raja Iftikhar Ahmed was the first educated lady in kalri. She established first girls school in the  town after the partition. In the field of education there are many high achievers particularly female e.g. Dr Gazala Akram (D/O Raja Muhammad Akram Khan) is the  first PhD and is currently Lecturer in Pharmacy at Strathclyde University, Glasgow, UK, and also senior Pharmacy Consultant at Yorkhill Children's Hospital, Glasgow, UK.

Adjoining Localities. Kalri a big union council comprising number of villages and localities with a population of over 20,000. These include; Kalri More (1.4 km),
Kamagri (1.5 km),
Hillan (1.8 km),
Ghaseet Phalli (1.2 km to the north west),
Malikabad (2.4 km),
Chah Mochian (3.5 km),
Gawwa/ Pir Gujja (1.4 km  to the north west),
Gura Nakka (2.4 km), 
Khaddora,
Mera Pothi,
(2.8 km to the east),
Pehl (3.9 km to the east),
Jabbi (5 km),
Ibrahimabad (4.5 km) etc.

Also a close village next to Kalri is Panjeri and these two villages have very close links.

People are trying their best for better livelihood and better education of their children. A foundation by the village named 'Khidmat-e-Insaniyat Foundation Kalri' (KIFK) has been set up to promote the cause of helping the helpless families in different facets of life, but with primary focus on education of their children.

References

Populated places in Bhimber District